The Fury of Hercules  is a 1962 peplum film written and directed by Gianfranco Parolini.

Plot 
Hercules is reached by the slave Daria, who informes him that his country has fallen into the hands of the tyrant Meniste. Hercules follows Daria in his homeland, where he discovers that Meniste enslaves the citizens of the city, and that a group of rebels are trying an insurrection. Meniste fears the power of Hercules, however he kills Daria. So Hercules puts himself in charge of the band of rebels, and destroys the power of Meniste.

Cast 
Brad Harris: Hercules
Luisella Boni: Daria (as Brigitte Corey)
Mara Berni: Cnidia
Serge Gainsbourg: Menistus 
Alan Steel: Kaldos
Carlo Tamberlani: Eridione 
Irena Prosen: Mila 
Franco Gasparri

Production
The film was shot at Dubrava Film in Zagreb, Croatia and on location in Zagreb.

Release
The Fury of Hercules as released in Italy on 21 March 1962.

See also
 List of Italian films of 1962

References

Bibliography

External links

1962 films
1962 adventure films
Peplum films
Films about Heracles
Films directed by Gianfranco Parolini
Films shot in Croatia
Sword and sandal films
1960s Italian films